Joseph or Joe Reid may refer to:

 Joseph Reid (politician) (1917–2015), Canadian politician
 Joseph Reid (wrestler) (1905–1968), British wrestler
 Joseph D. Reid (– ), American professor of economics
 Joseph L. Reid  (1923–2015), American oceanographer
 Joe Reid (died 1996), American flight instructor of Jessica Dubroff
 Joe Reid (American football) (born 1929), American football linebacker
 Neel Reid (1885–1926), American architect
 Joseph Reid (runner) (born 1996), British champion runner at the 2019 British Indoor Athletics Championships
 Joe Reid (footballer) (1896-1936), English footballer

See also
 Joseph Reed (disambiguation)
 Joseph Read (disambiguation)